Erasmus Samuel A. O. "Sam" Amukun (27 November 1940 – May 1998) was a Ugandan sprinter. He competed in the men's 100 metres, men's 200 metres and men's 4 x 100 metres relay at the 1960 Summer Olympics. He competed in the men's 200 metres and men's 4 x 100 metres relay at the 1964 Summer Olympics.

After the Olympics, he worked as a geologist.

References

External links
 

1940 births
1998 deaths
Athletes (track and field) at the 1960 Summer Olympics
Athletes (track and field) at the 1964 Summer Olympics
Ugandan geologists
Ugandan male sprinters
Olympic athletes of Uganda
Athletes (track and field) at the 1958 British Empire and Commonwealth Games
Commonwealth Games competitors for Uganda
20th-century geologists